Adhemar Gonzaga (26 January 1901 – 29 January 1978) was a Brazilian actor, screenwriter, film producer, and director.

Biography

Born into a wealthy family Gonzaga had a passion for cinema from an early age, and first appeared on screen in a short advertising film in 1920. He worked as a journalist for the film magazine Cinearte (1926–1942) which advocated the creation of a more professional, commercial film industry in Brazil. In 1928 he directed his first film, a silent. The film was a strong commercial success, and on the strength of it Gonzaga persuaded his father to financially back a film studio.

After a period of study in Hollywood, Gonzaga returned to Brazil and founded Cinédia a Rio de Janeiro-based company which quickly became the leading studio in Brazil. Cinédia specialised in producing Chanchadas, musical comedies with a populist appeal which often featured leading stage and singing stars. Chanchadas produced during Gonzaga's reign included Hello, Hello Brazil! (1935), Hello, Hello, Carnival! (1936) and Samba in Berlin (1943).  Many of Brazil's major stars appeared in Cinédia productions, including Carmen Miranda. The studio remained in continual operation until 1951.

Selected filmography

Producer
Ganga Bruta (1933)
Hello, Hello Brazil! (1935)
Onde Estás Felicidade? (1939)
Samba in Berlin (1943)
Berlin to the Samba Beat (1944)

Director
Barro Humano (1929)
Hello, Hello, Carnival! (1936)

Actor
Blood of Minas Gerais (1930)

References

Bibliography
Shaw, Lisa & Dennison, Stephanie. Brazilian National Cinema. Routledge, 2014.

External links

1901 births
1978 deaths
Brazilian journalists
Brazilian film producers
Brazilian film directors
Brazilian male film actors
Brazilian screenwriters
Male actors from Rio de Janeiro (city)
20th-century Brazilian male actors
20th-century screenwriters
20th-century journalists